Clathrodrillia petuchi is a species of sea snail, a marine gastropod mollusk in the family Drilliidae.

Description
The size of an adult shell varies between 30 mm and 53 mm. It is hollow on the inside.

Distribution
This species occurs in the Western Atlantic Ocean and the Caribbean Sea.

References

 Donn L.Tippett, Taxonomic notes on the western Atlantic Turridae (Gastropoda: Conoidea); The Nautilus. v. 109 (1995–1996) 
 Fallon P.J. (2016). Taxonomic review of tropical western Atlantic shallow water Drilliidae (Mollusca: Gastropoda: Conoidea) including descriptions of 100 new species. Zootaxa. 4090(1): 1–363

External links
 

petuchi
Gastropods described in 1995